In computational number theory,  Evdokimov's algorithm, named after Sergei Evdokimov, is the asymptotically fastest known algorithm for factorization of polynomials (until 2019). It can factorize a one-variable polynomial of degree  over an explicitly given finite field of cardinality . Assuming the generalized Riemann hypothesis the algorithm runs in deterministic time    (see Big O notation). This is an improvement of both Berlekamp's algorithm and Rónyai's algorithm in the sense that the first algorithm is polynomial for small characteristic of the field, whearas the second one is polynomial for small ; however, both of them are exponential if no restriction is made.

The factorization of a polynomial  over a ground field  is reduced to the case when  has no multiple roots and is completely splitting 
The main problem here is to find efficiently a nonzero zero-divisor in the algebra. The GRH is used only to take roots in finite fields in polynomial time. Thus the Evdokimov algorithm, in fact, solves a polynomial equation over a finite field "by radicals" in quasipolynomial time, see Time complexity.

The analyses of Evdokimov's algorithm is closely related with some problems in the association scheme theory. With the help of this approach, it was proved 
 that if  is a prime and  has a ‘large’ -smooth divisor , then a modification of the Evdokimov algorithm finds a nontrivial factor of the polynomial  in deterministic  time, assuming GRH and that .

References

Further reading 

Computational number theory